Mirabad, Mazul may refer to:
Mirabad (36°13′ N 58°40′ E), Mazul
Mirabad (36°18′ N 58°49′ E), Mazul